Akademik Sofia is a Bulgarian football club from Sofia, which currently plays in the fourth tier of Bulgarian football, A RFG Sofia South. The team's stadium is located in the Slatina municipality of Sofia and its capacity is 10,000.

Akademik was founded in 1947 by students from the Sofia University and debuted in A PFG in 1949. The team would quickly establish itself as a top flight team in Bulgarian football in the next decades. Akademik became one of the top Bulgarian teams in the 1950s and 1970s, performing strongly in the domestic and European competitions alike, having been crowned Balkans Cup champion in 1974, among other achievements. Akademik's last appearance in the Bulgarian First League came in 2010-11, after which the club experienced financial problems and folded after the 2011-12 season. It was refounded in 2013, starting from the fourth division.

History
Akademik was founded in the 1947, by Sofia University (the oldest higher education institution in Bulgaria, founded on 1 October 1888) students as a football club. Two years later, Akademik were promoted for the first time to the Bulgarian A Group. The 1950 season in the domestic league was very successful for the team, which finished 3rd in the top division. In the next campaign, Akademik finished fourth and reached the final of Bulgarian Cup, losing 0–1 to CSKA Sofia. In 1952 the club's form dropped, however, and they were relegated to B PFG finishing second to last, before Spartak Varna. Akademik would wait 12 years for another taste of top level football, when in 1964 the club managed to promote to the A Group again. The 1964–65 season was largely unsuccessful, with the students finishing last, suffering an immediate return to the B Group.

The third promotion to A Group in 1969 marked the beginning of Akademik's golden age. From 1969 to 1979, Akademik spent their longest ever period in the top division. In 1974, Akademik won its first international throphy, beating Vardar Skopje 2–0 on aggregate in the final of Balkans Cup. In the 1975–76 season the team finished 3rd in the domestic league and qualified for the first time for the UEFA Cup. At the European level, Akademik defeated Czechoslovak side SK Slavia Prague in the first round before making a memorable appearance in the second round against Italian giants A.C. Milan, winning 4–3 at home on 20 October 1976. However, Milan won the second leg 2-0 at the San Siro stadium, eliminating Akademik. During this successful period in the club’s history, two players from Akademik were selected to play for the Bulgarian national squad at a FIFA World Cup: Ivan Dimitrov for 1970 and Mladen Vasilev in 1974.

The glorious period for the Students ended when the club was relegated at the end of the 1978–79 season. Akademik won just six games in the campaign and this put them in last place. In the next season, the team won promotion back to the top division, scoring 100 goals in the B Group campaign. In 1981, the Students qualified for second time for the UEFA Cup, where they lost 1–3 on aggregate in the first round against 1. FC Kaiserslautern. In the same 1981–82 season, Akademik did not perform well in the league and was relegated once more. From 1982 to 2010, Akademik spent their longest ever period out of the top division.

After 28 years in the lowers divisions of Bulgarian football, in 2009–10 Akademik finished 2nd in B Group and the club managed to participate in the play-off for promotion in the A PFG. On May 23, 2010, Akademik managed to win the play-off against Nesebar with a result of 2:1 and finally qualified again for the top division.

During the summer of 2010, Akademik announced that the team would  play their home games at the Slavia Stadium, home of Slavia Sofia, instead of their usual stadium, Akademik Stadium. This was because Akademik Stadium did not obtain approval from the BFU. The return to the elite proved to be difficult for the Students. Akademik won only 5 games, and drew 5 more, out of 30 games in total. This only earned the team 20 points, which was 5 points below PFC Vidima-Rakovski Sevlievo, who qualified for the relegation playoffs. Despite the bad results, Akademik was above the relegation zone up until round 25 of the season. The biggest highlight for Akademik was probably when the team managed to draw 1-1 against CSKA, the most decorated team in Bulgarian football. However, Akademik was eventually relegated from the A Group at the end of the season after finishing in 15th place. 

The team finished 7th in the 2011–12 B Group, meaning they were relegated to the V AFG. However, the team decided not to play the following season, citing financial problems as the main reason. The team was subsequently dissolved in 2012, only keeping its youth levels active until 2013, when Akademik was re-founded, starting from the fourth tier of Bulgarian football, the regional league of Sofia city. The reformed club took the name of Akademik 1947 Sofia.

League positions

Honours

Domestic
A Group:
  Third place (2): 1950, 1975–76

B Group:
  Winners (2): 1963–64, 1979–80
  Runners-up (1): 2009–10

Bulgarian Cup:
  Runners-up (1): 1951

European
Balkans Cup
  Winners (1): 1974

UEFA Cup
 1/16 finalist: 1976–77

European cup history

Notable stats

References

External links

  Page in Facebook

Football clubs in Sofia
Association football clubs established in 1947
1947 establishments in Bulgaria